Coon tail, coontail, or coon's tail may refer to:
Ceratophyllum, aquatic plant
Crotalus atrox, Western diamondback rattlesnake